Båven is a lake in the municipalities Flens, Gnesta, and Nyköping in Södermanland, Sweden. The lake is characterized by branches and many islands, with over 500 km of shoreline.   Around Båven there are a number of estates and manors, including Sparreholm, Vibyholm and Rockelstad.

References 

Lakes of Södermanland County